The Frøken Norge 2010 beauty pageant was held at the Sole Hotell & Herregaard in Noresund, Norway on 26 June 2010. 7 finalists competed for the two winner titles.

The eventual winners were Mariann Birkedal from Stavanger, a former Frøken Norge (2008) runner-up and Miss Universe (2008) contestant – Frøken Norge for Miss World – who represented Norway in Miss World 2010 in Sanya, China where she was a Top 7 finalist; and half Motswana Melinda Elvenes from Larvik – Frøken Norge for Miss Universe – who represented Norway in Miss Universe 2010 in Las Vegas, the United States.

Final results

The 7 finalists

Notes
Mariann Birkedal represented Norway in Miss Universe 2008 in Vietnam. Even though she was among the favourites to win the crown, she did not place in the Top 15.
Melinda Elvenes was born in Maun, Botswana to a Batswana mother and a Norwegian father.
Lene Kaland Eriksen was originally one of the eight finalists, but she withdrew from the contest due to unknown reasons.

References

Miss Norway
2010 beauty pageants
2010 in Norway